Neptune is the eighth planet from the Sun and the farthest known planet in the Solar System. It is the fourth-largest planet in the Solar System by diameter, the third-most-massive planet, and the densest giant planet. It is 17 times the mass of Earth, and slightly more massive than its near-twin Uranus. Neptune is denser and physically smaller than Uranus because its greater mass causes more gravitational compression of its atmosphere. Being composed primarily of gases and liquids, it has no well-defined solid surface. It is named after the Roman god of the sea and has the astronomical symbol , representing Neptune's trident.

Neptune is not visible to the unaided eye and is the only planet in the Solar System found by mathematical prediction rather than by empirical observation. Unexpected changes in the orbit of Uranus led Alexis Bouvard to hypothesise that its orbit was subject to gravitational perturbation by an unknown planet. After Bouvard's death, the position of Neptune was predicted from his observations, independently, by John Couch Adams and Urbain Le Verrier. Neptune was subsequently observed with a telescope on 23 September 1846 by Johann Galle within a degree of the position predicted by Le Verrier. Its largest moon, Triton, was discovered shortly thereafter, though none of the planet's remaining 13 known moons were located telescopically until the 20th century. The planet's distance from Earth gives it a very small apparent size, making it challenging to study with Earth-based telescopes. Neptune was visited by Voyager 2, when it flew by the planet on 25 August 1989; Voyager 2 remains the only spacecraft to have visited Neptune. The advent of the Hubble Space Telescope and large ground-based telescopes with adaptive optics has recently allowed for additional detailed observations from afar.

Like the gas giants (Jupiter and Saturn), Neptune's atmosphere is composed primarily of hydrogen and helium, along with traces of hydrocarbons and possibly nitrogen, but contains a higher proportion of ices such as water, ammonia and methane. Similar to Uranus, its interior is primarily composed of ices and rock; both planets are normally considered "ice giants" to distinguish them. Along with Rayleigh scattering, traces of methane in the outermost regions in part account for the planet's blue appearance. Newest data from the Gemini observatory shows the blue colour is more saturated than the one present on Uranus due to thinner haze of Neptune's more active atmosphere.

In contrast to the hazy, relatively featureless atmosphere of Uranus, Neptune's atmosphere has active and visible weather patterns. For example, at the time of the Voyager 2 flyby in 1989, the planet's southern hemisphere had a Great Dark Spot comparable to the Great Red Spot on Jupiter. More recently, in 2018, a newer main dark spot and smaller dark spot were identified and studied. Because of its great distance from the Sun, Neptune's outer atmosphere is one of the coldest places in the Solar System, with temperatures at its cloud tops approaching . Neptune has a faint and fragmented ring system (labelled "arcs"), which was discovered in 1984, then later confirmed by Voyager 2.

History

Discovery 

Some of the earliest recorded observations ever made through a telescope, Galileo Galilei's drawings on 28 December 1612 and 27 January 1613 contain plotted points that match up with what is now known to have been the positions of Neptune on those dates. On both occasions, Galileo seems to have mistaken Neptune for a fixed star when it appeared close—in conjunction—to Jupiter in the night sky. Hence, he is not credited with Neptune's discovery. At his first observation in December 1612, Neptune was almost stationary in the sky because it had just turned retrograde that day. This apparent backward motion is created when Earth's orbit takes it past an outer planet. Because Neptune was only beginning its yearly retrograde cycle, the motion of the planet was far too slight to be detected with Galileo's small telescope. In 2009, a study suggested that Galileo was at least aware that the "star" he had observed had moved relative to the fixed stars.

In 1821, Alexis Bouvard published astronomical tables of the orbit of Neptune's neighbour Uranus. Subsequent observations revealed substantial deviations from the tables, leading Bouvard to hypothesise that an unknown body was perturbing the orbit through gravitational interaction. In 1843, John Couch Adams began work on the orbit of Uranus using the data he had. He requested extra data from Sir George Airy, the Astronomer Royal, who supplied it in February 1844. Adams continued to work in 1845–1846 and produced several different estimates of a new planet.

In 1845–1846, Urbain Le Verrier, independently of Adams, developed his own calculations but aroused no enthusiasm in his compatriots. In June 1846, upon seeing Le Verrier's first published estimate of the planet's longitude and its similarity to Adams's estimate, Airy persuaded James Challis to search for the planet. Challis vainly scoured the sky throughout August and September. Challis had, in fact, observed Neptune a year before the planet's subsequent discoverer, Johann Gottfried Galle, and on two occasions, 4 and 12 August 1845. However, his out-of-date star maps and poor observing techniques meant that he failed to recognise the observations as such until he carried out later analysis. Challis was full of remorse but blamed his neglect on his maps and the fact that he was distracted by his concurrent work on comet observations.

Meanwhile, Le Verrier sent a letter and urged Berlin Observatory astronomer Galle to search with the observatory's refractor. Heinrich d'Arrest, a student at the observatory, suggested to Galle that they could compare a recently drawn chart of the sky in the region of Le Verrier's predicted location with the current sky to seek the displacement characteristic of a planet, as opposed to a fixed star. On the evening of 23 September 1846, the day Galle received the letter, he discovered Neptune just northeast of Iota Aquarii, 1° from the "five degrees east of Delta Capricorn" position Le Verrier had predicted it to be, about 12° from Adams's prediction, and on the border of Aquarius and Capricornus according to the modern IAU constellation boundaries.

In the wake of the discovery, there was a heated nationalistic rivalry between the French and the British over who deserved credit for the discovery. Eventually, an international consensus emerged that Le Verrier and Adams deserved joint credit. Since 1966, Dennis Rawlins has questioned the credibility of Adams's claim to co-discovery, and the issue was re-evaluated by historians with the return in 1998 of the "Neptune papers" (historical documents) to the Royal Observatory, Greenwich.

Naming 
Shortly after its discovery, Neptune was referred to simply as "the planet exterior to Uranus" or as "Le Verrier's planet". The first suggestion for a name came from Galle, who proposed the name Janus. In England, Challis put forward the name Oceanus.

Claiming the right to name his discovery, Le Verrier quickly proposed the name Neptune for this new planet, though falsely stating that this had been officially approved by the French Bureau des Longitudes. In October, he sought to name the planet Le Verrier, after himself, and he had loyal support in this from the observatory director, François Arago. This suggestion met with stiff resistance outside France. French almanacs quickly reintroduced the name Herschel for Uranus, after that planet's discoverer Sir William Herschel, and Leverrier for the new planet.

Struve came out in favour of the name Neptune on 29 December 1846, to the Saint Petersburg Academy of Sciences. Soon, Neptune became the internationally accepted name. In Roman mythology, Neptune was the god of the sea, identified with the Greek Poseidon. The demand for a mythological name seemed to be in keeping with the nomenclature of the other planets, all of which were named for deities in Greek and Roman mythology.

Most languages today use some variant of the name "Neptune" for the planet; indeed, in Chinese, Vietnamese, Japanese, and Korean, the planet's name was translated as "sea king star". In Mongolian, Neptune is called , reflecting its namesake god's role as the ruler of the sea. In modern Greek the planet is called Poseidon, the Greek counterpart of Neptune. In Māori, the planet is called , named after the Māori god of the sea. In Nahuatl, the planet is called , named after the rain god Tlāloc. In Thai, Neptune is referred to by its Westernised name , but is also called , after Ketu, the descending lunar node, who plays a role in Hindu astrology.

The usual adjectival form is Neptunian. The nonce form Poseidean, from Poseidon, has also been used, though the usual adjectival form of Poseidon is Poseidonian.

Status 
From its discovery in 1846 until the discovery of Pluto in 1930, Neptune was the farthest known planet. When Pluto was discovered, it was considered a planet, and Neptune thus became the second-farthest known planet, except for a 20-year period between 1979 and 1999 when Pluto's elliptical orbit brought it closer than Neptune to the Sun, making Neptune the ninth planet from the Sun during this period. The increasingly accurate estimations of Pluto's mass from ten times that of Earth's to far less than that of the Moon and the discovery of the Kuiper belt in 1992 led many astronomers to debate whether Pluto should be considered a planet or as part of the Kuiper belt. In 2006, the International Astronomical Union defined the word "planet" for the first time, reclassifying Pluto as a "dwarf planet" and making Neptune once again the outermost-known planet in the Solar System.

Physical characteristics 

Neptune's mass of 1.0243 kg is intermediate between Earth and the larger gas giants: it is 17 times that of Earth but just 1/19th that of Jupiter. Its gravity at 1 bar is 11.15 m/s2, 1.14 times the surface gravity of Earth, and surpassed only by Jupiter. Neptune's equatorial radius of 24,764 km is nearly four times that of Earth. Neptune, like Uranus, is an ice giant, a subclass of giant planet, because they are smaller and have higher concentrations of volatiles than Jupiter and Saturn. In the search for exoplanets, Neptune has been used as a metonym: discovered bodies of similar mass are often referred to as "Neptunes", just as scientists refer to various extrasolar bodies as "Jupiters".

Internal structure 

Neptune's internal structure resembles that of Uranus. Its atmosphere forms about 5 to 10% of its mass and extends perhaps 10 to 20% of the way towards the core, where it reaches pressures of about 10 GPa, or about 100,000 times that of Earth's atmosphere. Increasing concentrations of methane, ammonia and water are found in the lower regions of the atmosphere.

The mantle is equivalent to 10 to 15 Earth masses and is rich in water, ammonia and methane. As is customary in planetary science, this mixture is referred to as icy even though it is a hot, dense fluid (supercritical fluid). This fluid, which has a high electrical conductivity, is sometimes called a water–ammonia ocean. The mantle may consist of a layer of ionic water in which the water molecules break down into a soup of hydrogen and oxygen ions, and deeper down superionic water in which the oxygen crystallises but the hydrogen ions float around freely within the oxygen lattice. At a depth of 7,000 km, the conditions may be such that methane decomposes into diamond crystals that rain downwards like hailstones. Scientists also believe that this kind of diamond rain occurs on Jupiter, Saturn, and Uranus. Very-high-pressure experiments at the Lawrence Livermore National Laboratory suggest that the top of the mantle may be an ocean of liquid carbon with floating solid 'diamonds'.

The core of Neptune is likely composed of iron, nickel and silicates, with an interior model giving a mass about 1.2 times that of Earth. The pressure at the centre is 7 Mbar (700 GPa), about twice as high as that at the centre of Earth, and the temperature may be 5,400 K.

Atmosphere 

At high altitudes, Neptune's atmosphere is 80% hydrogen and 19% helium. A trace amount of methane is also present. Prominent absorption bands of methane exist at wavelengths above 600 nm, in the red and infrared portion of the spectrum. As with Uranus, this absorption of red light by the atmospheric methane is part of what gives Neptune its blue hue, although Neptune's blue differs from Uranus's milder light blue.

Neptune's atmosphere is subdivided into two main regions: the lower troposphere, where temperature decreases with altitude, and the stratosphere, where temperature increases with altitude. The stratosphere then gives way to the thermosphere at a pressure lower than 10−5 to 10−4 bars (1 to 10 Pa). The thermosphere gradually transitions to the exosphere.

Models suggest that Neptune's troposphere is banded by clouds of varying compositions depending on altitude. The upper-level clouds lie at pressures below one bar, where the temperature is suitable for methane to condense. For pressures between one and five bars (100 and 500 kPa), clouds of ammonia and hydrogen sulfide are thought to form. Above a pressure of five bars, the clouds may consist of ammonia, ammonium sulfide, hydrogen sulfide and water. Underneath, clouds of ammonia and hydrogen sulfide may be found.

High-altitude clouds on Neptune have been observed casting shadows on the opaque cloud deck below. There are also high-altitude cloud bands that wrap around the planet at constant latitude. These circumferential bands have widths of 50–150 km and lie about 50–110 km above the cloud deck. These altitudes are in the layer where weather occurs, the troposphere. Weather does not occur in the higher stratosphere or thermosphere.

Neptune's spectra suggest that its lower stratosphere is hazy due to condensation of products of ultraviolet photolysis of methane, such as ethane and ethyne. The stratosphere is also home to trace amounts of carbon monoxide and hydrogen cyanide. The stratosphere of Neptune is warmer than that of Uranus due to the elevated concentration of hydrocarbons.

For reasons that remain obscure, the planet's thermosphere is at an anomalously high temperature of about 750 K. The planet is too far from the Sun for this heat to be generated by ultraviolet radiation. One candidate for a heating mechanism is atmospheric interaction with ions in the planet's magnetic field. Other candidates are gravity waves from the interior that dissipate in the atmosphere. The thermosphere contains traces of carbon dioxide and water, which may have been deposited from external sources such as meteorites and dust.

Magnetosphere 
Neptune resembles Uranus in its magnetosphere, with a magnetic field strongly tilted relative to its rotational axis at 47° and offset at least 0.55 radius, or about 13,500 km from the planet's physical centre. Before Voyager 2 arrival at Neptune, it was hypothesised that Uranus's tilted magnetosphere was the result of its sideways rotation. In comparing the magnetic fields of the two planets, scientists now think the extreme orientation may be characteristic of flows in the planets' interiors. This field may be generated by convective fluid motions in a thin spherical shell of electrically conducting liquids (probably a combination of ammonia, methane and water) resulting in a dynamo action.

The dipole component of the magnetic field at the magnetic equator of Neptune is about 14 microteslas (0.14 G). The dipole magnetic moment of Neptune is about 2.2 T·m3 (14 μT·RN3, where RN is the radius of Neptune). Neptune's magnetic field has a complex geometry that includes relatively large contributions from non-dipolar components, including a strong quadrupole moment that may exceed the dipole moment in strength. By contrast, Earth, Jupiter and Saturn have only relatively small quadrupole moments, and their fields are less tilted from the polar axis. The large quadrupole moment of Neptune may be the result of offset from the planet's centre and geometrical constraints of the field's dynamo generator.

Neptune's bow shock, where the magnetosphere begins to slow the solar wind, occurs at a distance of 34.9 times the radius of the planet. The magnetopause, where the pressure of the magnetosphere counterbalances the solar wind, lies at a distance of 23–26.5 times the radius of Neptune. The tail of the magnetosphere extends out to at least 72 times the radius of Neptune, and likely much farther.

Climate 

Neptune's weather is characterised by extremely dynamic storm systems, with winds reaching speeds of almost —nearly reaching supersonic flow. More typically, by tracking the motion of persistent clouds, wind speeds have been shown to vary from 20 m/s in the easterly direction to 325 m/s westward. At the cloud tops, the prevailing winds range in speed from 400 m/s along the equator to 250 m/s at the poles. Most of the winds on Neptune move in a direction opposite the planet's rotation. The general pattern of winds showed prograde rotation at high latitudes vs. retrograde rotation at lower latitudes. The difference in flow direction is thought to be a "skin effect" and not due to any deeper atmospheric processes. At 70° S latitude, a high-speed jet travels at a speed of 300 m/s.

Neptune differs from Uranus in its typical level of meteorological activity. Voyager 2 observed weather phenomena on Neptune during its 1989 flyby, but no comparable phenomena on Uranus during its 1986 fly-by.

The abundance of methane, ethane and acetylene at Neptune's equator is 10–100 times greater than at the poles. This is interpreted as evidence for upwelling at the equator and subsidence near the poles because photochemistry cannot account for the distribution without meridional circulation.

The temperature differential is enough to let methane, which elsewhere is frozen in the troposphere, escape into the stratosphere near the pole. The relative "hot spot" is due to Neptune's axial tilt, which has exposed the south pole to the Sun for the last quarter of Neptune's year, or roughly 40 Earth years. As Neptune slowly moves towards the opposite side of the Sun, the south pole will be darkened and the north pole illuminated, causing the methane release to shift to the north pole.

Because of seasonal changes, the cloud bands in the southern hemisphere of Neptune have been observed to increase in size and albedo. This trend was first seen in 1980. The long orbital period of Neptune results in seasons lasting forty years.

Storms 
In 1989, the Great Dark Spot, an anticyclonic storm system spanning  was discovered by NASA's Voyager 2 spacecraft. The storm resembled the Great Red Spot of Jupiter. Some five years later, on 2 November 1994, the Hubble Space Telescope did not see the Great Dark Spot on the planet. Instead, a new storm similar to the Great Dark Spot was found in Neptune's northern hemisphere.

The  is another storm, a white cloud group farther south than the Great Dark Spot. This nickname first arose during the months leading up to the Voyager 2 encounter in 1989, when they were observed moving at speeds faster than the Great Dark Spot (and images acquired later would subsequently reveal the presence of clouds moving even faster than those that had initially been detected by Voyager 2). The Small Dark Spot is a southern cyclonic storm, the second-most-intense storm observed during the 1989 encounter. It was initially completely dark, but as Voyager 2 approached the planet, a bright core developed and can be seen in most of the highest-resolution images. More recently, in 2018, a newer main dark spot and smaller dark spot were identified and studied.

Neptune's dark spots are thought to occur in the troposphere at lower altitudes than the brighter cloud features, so they appear as holes in the upper cloud decks. As they are stable features that can persist for several months, they are thought to be vortex structures. Often associated with dark spots are brighter, persistent methane clouds that form around the tropopause layer. The persistence of companion clouds shows that some former dark spots may continue to exist as cyclones even though they are no longer visible as a dark feature. Dark spots may dissipate when they migrate too close to the equator or possibly through some other, unknown mechanism.

Internal heating 

Neptune's more varied weather when compared to Uranus is due in part to its higher internal heating. Deeper inside the layers of gas, the temperature rises steadily. As with Uranus, the source of this heating is unknown, but the discrepancy is larger: Uranus only radiates 1.1 times as much energy as it receives from the Sun; whereas Neptune radiates about 2.61 times as much energy as it receives from the Sun. Neptune is the farthest planet from the Sun, and lies over 50% farther from the Sun than Uranus, and receives only 40% its amount of sunlight, yet its internal energy is sufficient to drive the fastest planetary winds seen in the Solar System. Depending on the thermal properties of its interior, the heat left over from Neptune's formation may be sufficient to explain its current heat flow, though it is more difficult to simultaneously explain Uranus's lack of internal heat while preserving the apparent similarity between the two planets.

Orbit and rotation 

The perihelion distance is 29.81 AU; the aphelion distance is 30.33 AU.

On 11 July 2011, Neptune completed its first full barycentric orbit since its discovery in 1846, although it did not appear at its exact discovery position in the sky, because Earth was in a different location in its 365.26 day orbit. Because of the motion of the Sun in relation to the barycentre of the Solar System, on 11 July Neptune was also not at its exact discovery position in relation to the Sun; if the more common heliocentric coordinate system is used, the discovery longitude was reached on 12 July 2011.

The elliptical orbit of Neptune is inclined 1.77° compared to that of Earth.

The axial tilt of Neptune is 28.32°, which is similar to the tilts of Earth (23°) and Mars (25°). As a result, Neptune experiences similar seasonal changes to Earth. The long orbital period of Neptune means that the seasons last for forty Earth years. Its sidereal rotation period (day) is roughly 16.11 hours. Because its axial tilt is comparable to Earth's, the variation in the length of its day over the course of its long year is not any more extreme.

Because Neptune is not a solid body, its atmosphere undergoes differential rotation. The wide equatorial zone rotates with a period of about 18 hours, which is slower than the 16.1-hour rotation of the planet's magnetic field. By contrast, the reverse is true for the polar regions where the rotation period is 12 hours. This differential rotation is the most pronounced of any planet in the Solar System, and it results in strong latitudinal wind shear.

Orbital resonances 

Neptune's orbit has a profound impact on the region directly beyond it, known as the Kuiper belt. The Kuiper belt is a ring of small icy worlds, similar to the asteroid belt but far larger, extending from Neptune's orbit at 30 AU out to about 55 AU from the Sun. Much in the same way that Jupiter's gravity dominates the asteroid belt, shaping its structure, so Neptune's gravity dominates the Kuiper belt. Over the age of the Solar System, certain regions of the Kuiper belt became destabilised by Neptune's gravity, creating gaps in its structure. The region between 40 and 42 AU is an example.

There do exist orbits within these empty regions where objects can survive for the age of the Solar System. These resonances occur when Neptune's orbital period is a precise fraction of that of the object, such as 1:2, or 3:4. If, say, an object orbits the Sun once for every two Neptune orbits, it will only complete half an orbit by the time Neptune returns to its original position. The most heavily populated resonance in the Kuiper belt, with over 200 known objects, is the 2:3 resonance. Objects in this resonance complete 2 orbits for every 3 of Neptune, and are known as plutinos because the largest of the known Kuiper belt objects, Pluto, is among them. Although Pluto crosses Neptune's orbit regularly, the 2:3 resonance ensures they can never collide. The 3:4, 3:5, 4:7 and 2:5 resonances are less populated.

Neptune has a number of known trojan objects occupying both the Sun–Neptune  and  Lagrangian points—gravitationally stable regions leading and trailing Neptune in its orbit, respectively. Neptune trojans can be viewed as being in a 1:1 resonance with Neptune. Some Neptune trojans are remarkably stable in their orbits, and are likely to have formed alongside Neptune rather than being captured. Neptune also has a temporary quasi-satellite, . The object has been a quasi-satellite of Neptune for about 12,500 years and it will remain in that dynamical state for another 12,500 years.

Formation and migration 

The formation of the ice giants, Neptune and Uranus, has proven difficult to model precisely. Current models suggest that the matter density in the outer regions of the Solar System was too low to account for the formation of such large bodies from the traditionally accepted method of core accretion, and various hypotheses have been advanced to explain their formation. One is that the ice giants were not formed by core accretion but from instabilities within the original protoplanetary disc and later had their atmospheres blasted away by radiation from a nearby massive OB star.

An alternative concept is that they formed closer to the Sun, where the matter density was higher, and then subsequently migrated to their current orbits after the removal of the gaseous protoplanetary disc. This hypothesis of migration after formation is favoured, due to its ability to better explain the occupancy of the populations of small objects observed in the trans-Neptunian region. The current most widely accepted explanation of the details of this hypothesis is known as the Nice model, which explores the effect of a migrating Neptune and the other giant planets on the structure of the Kuiper belt.

Moons 

Neptune has 14 known moons. Triton is the largest Neptunian moon, comprising more than 99.5% of the mass in orbit around Neptune, and it is the only one massive enough to be spheroidal. Triton was discovered by William Lassell just 17 days after the discovery of Neptune itself. Unlike all other large planetary moons in the Solar System, Triton has a retrograde orbit, indicating that it was captured rather than forming in place; it was probably once a dwarf planet in the Kuiper belt. It is close enough to Neptune to be locked into a synchronous rotation, and it is slowly spiralling inward because of tidal acceleration. It will eventually be torn apart, in about 3.6 billion years, when it reaches the Roche limit.

Neptune's second-known satellite (by order of discovery), the irregular moon Nereid, has one of the most eccentric orbits of any satellite in the Solar System. The eccentricity of 0.7512 gives it an apoapsis that is seven times its periapsis distance from Neptune.

From July to September 1989, Voyager 2 discovered six moons of Neptune. Of these, the irregularly shaped Proteus is notable for being as large as a body of its density can be without being pulled into a spherical shape by its own gravity. Although the second-most-massive Neptunian moon, it is only 0.25% the mass of Triton. Neptune's innermost four moons—Naiad, Thalassa, Despina and Galatea—orbit close enough to be within Neptune's rings. The next-farthest out, Larissa, was originally discovered in 1981 when it had occulted a star. This occultation had been attributed to ring arcs, but when Voyager 2 observed Neptune in 1989, Larissa was found to have caused it. Five new irregular moons discovered between 2002 and 2003 were announced in 2004. A new moon and the smallest yet, Hippocamp, was found in 2013 by combining multiple Hubble images. Because Neptune was the Roman god of the sea, Neptune's moons have been named after lesser sea gods.

Planetary rings 

Neptune has a planetary ring system, though one much less substantial than that of Saturn. The rings may consist of ice particles coated with silicates or carbon-based material, which most likely gives them a reddish hue. The three main rings are the narrow Adams Ring, 63,000 km from the centre of Neptune, the Le Verrier Ring, at 53,000 km, and the broader, fainter Galle Ring, at 42,000 km. A faint outward extension to the Le Verrier Ring has been named Lassell; it is bounded at its outer edge by the Arago Ring at 57,000 km.

The first of these planetary rings was detected in 1968 by a team led by Edward Guinan. In the early 1980s, analysis of this data along with newer observations led to the hypothesis that this ring might be incomplete.
Evidence that the rings might have gaps first arose during a stellar occultation in 1984 when the rings obscured a star on immersion but not on emersion. Images from Voyager 2 in 1989 settled the issue by showing several faint rings.

The outermost ring, Adams, contains five prominent arcs now named Courage, Liberté, Egalité 1, Egalité 2 and Fraternité (Courage, Liberty, Equality and Fraternity). The existence of arcs was difficult to explain because the laws of motion would predict that arcs would spread out into a uniform ring over short timescales. Astronomers now estimate that the arcs are corralled into their current form by the gravitational effects of Galatea, a moon just inward from the ring.

Earth-based observations announced in 2005 appeared to show that Neptune's rings are much more unstable than previously thought. Images taken from the W. M. Keck Observatory in 2002 and 2003 show considerable decay in the rings when compared to images by Voyager 2. In particular, it seems that the Liberté arc might disappear in as little as one century.

Observation 

Neptune brightened about 10% between 1980 and 2000 mostly due to the changing of the seasons. Neptune may continue to brighten as it approaches perihelion in 2042. The apparent magnitude currently ranges from 7.67 to 7.89 with a mean of 7.78 and a standard deviation of 0.06. Prior to 1980 the planet was as faint as magnitude 8.0. Neptune is too faint to be visible to the naked eye. It can be outshone by Jupiter's Galilean moons, the dwarf planet Ceres and the asteroids 4 Vesta, 2 Pallas, 7 Iris, 3 Juno, and 6 Hebe. A telescope or strong binoculars will resolve Neptune as a small blue disk, similar in appearance to Uranus.

Because of the distance of Neptune from Earth, its angular diameter only ranges from 2.2 to 2.4 arcseconds, the smallest of the Solar System planets. Its small apparent size makes it challenging to study visually. Most telescopic data was fairly limited until the advent of the Hubble Space Telescope and large ground-based telescopes with adaptive optics (AO). The first scientifically useful observation of Neptune from ground-based telescopes using adaptive optics was commenced in 1997 from Hawaii. Neptune is currently approaching perihelion (closest approach to the Sun) and has been shown to be heating up, with increased atmospheric activity and brightness as a consequence. Combined with technological advancements, ground-based telescopes with adaptive optics are recording increasingly more detailed images of it. Both Hubble and the adaptive-optics telescopes on Earth have made many new discoveries within the Solar System since the mid-1990s, with a large increase in the number of known satellites and moons around the outer planet, among others. In 2004 and 2005, five new small satellites of Neptune with diameters between 38 and 61 kilometres were discovered.

From Earth, Neptune goes through apparent retrograde motion every 367 days, resulting in a looping motion against the background stars during each opposition. These loops carried it close to the 1846 discovery coordinates in April and July 2010 and again in October and November 2011.

Neptune's 164-year orbital period means that the planet takes an average of 13 years to move through each constellation of the zodiac. In 2011, it completed its first full orbit of the Sun since being discovered and returned to where it was first spotted northeast of Iota Aquarii.

Observation of Neptune in the radio-frequency band shows that it is a source of both continuous emission and irregular bursts. Both sources are thought to originate from its rotating magnetic field. In the infrared part of the spectrum, Neptune's storms appear bright against the cooler background, allowing the size and shape of these features to be readily tracked.

Exploration 

Voyager 2 is the only spacecraft that has visited Neptune. The spacecraft closest approach to the planet occurred on 25 August 1989. Because this was the last major planet the spacecraft could visit, it was decided to make a close flyby of the moon Triton, regardless of the consequences to the trajectory, similarly to what was done for Voyager 1s encounter with Saturn and its moon Titan. The images relayed back to Earth from Voyager 2 became the basis of a 1989 PBS all-night program, Neptune All Night.

During the encounter, signals from the spacecraft required 246 minutes to reach Earth. Hence, for the most part, Voyager 2 mission relied on preloaded commands for the Neptune encounter. The spacecraft performed a near-encounter with the moon Nereid before it came within 4,400 km of Neptune's atmosphere on 25 August, then passed close to the planet's largest moon Triton later the same day.

The spacecraft verified the existence of a magnetic field surrounding the planet and discovered that the field was offset from the centre and tilted in a manner similar to the field around Uranus. Neptune's rotation period was determined using measurements of radio emissions and Voyager 2 also showed that Neptune had a surprisingly active weather system. Six new moons were discovered, and the planet was shown to have more than one ring.

The flyby also provided the first accurate measurement of Neptune's mass which was found to be 0.5 percent less than previously calculated. The new figure disproved the hypothesis that an undiscovered Planet X acted upon the orbits of Neptune and Uranus.

Since 2018, the China National Space Administration has been studying a concept for a pair of Voyager-like interstellar probes tentatively known as Interstellar Express or Interstellar Heliosphere Probe. Both probes will be launched at the same time in 2024 and take differing paths to explore opposing ends of the heliosphere; the second probe, IHP-2, will fly by Neptune in January 2038, passing only 1,000 km above the cloud tops, and potentially carry an atmospheric impactor to be released during its approach. Afterward, it will continue on its mission throughout the Kuiper belt toward the tail of the heliosphere, so far unexplored.

After Voyager 2 and IHP-2s flybys, the next step in scientific exploration of the Neptunian system is considered to be an orbital mission; most proposals have been by NASA, most often for a Flagship orbiter. Such a hypothetical mission is envisioned to be possible in the late 2020s or early 2030s. However, there have been discussions to launch Neptune missions sooner. In 2003, there was a proposal in NASA's "Vision Missions Studies" for a "Neptune Orbiter with Probes" mission that does Cassini-level science. Another, more recent proposal was for Argo, a flyby spacecraft to be launched in 2019, that would visit Jupiter, Saturn, Neptune, and a Kuiper belt object. The focus would be on Neptune and its largest moon Triton to be investigated around 2029. The proposed New Horizons 2 mission (which was later scrapped) might also have done a close flyby of the Neptunian system. Currently a pending proposal for the Discovery program, Trident would conduct a flyby of Neptune and Triton; however, the mission was not selected for Discovery 15 or 16. Neptune Odyssey is the current mission concept for a Neptune orbiter and atmospheric probe being studied as a possible large strategic science mission by NASA that would launch between 2031 and 2033, and arrive at Neptune by 2049.

See also 

 Outline of Neptune
 Hot Neptune
 Neptune in astrology
 Neptunium
 Neptune, the Mystic – one of the seven movements in Gustav Holst's Planets suite
 Timeline of the far future
 Stats of planets in the Solar System

Notes

References

Bibliography

Further reading

External links 

 NASA's Neptune fact sheet
 Neptune from Bill Arnett's nineplanets.org
 Neptune Astronomy Cast episode No. 63, includes full transcript.
 Neptune Profile (archived 15 November 2002) at NASA's Solar System Exploration site
 Interactive 3D gravity simulation of Neptune and its inner moons 

Neptune
18460923
Gas giants
Ice giants
Outer planets